The Kirchlispitzen (2,552 m) is a mountain in the Rätikon range of the Alps, located on the border between Austria and Switzerland. It overlooks the Lünersee on its northern side.

References

External links

 Kirchlispitzen on Hikr

Mountains of the Alps
Mountains of Switzerland
Mountains of Graubünden
Mountains of Vorarlberg
Two-thousanders of Switzerland
Seewis im Prättigau